The 1928 Tempe State Bulldogs football team was an American football team that represented Tempe State Teachers College (later renamed Arizona State University) as an independent during the 1928 college football season. In their sixth season under head coach Aaron McCreary, the Bulldogs compiled a 3–2–1 record and outscored their opponents by a combined total of 133 to 73. The team's games included a scoreless tie with UTEP and a 39–0 loss in the Arizona–Arizona State football rivalry. William Dick was the team captain.

Schedule

References

Tempe State
Arizona State Sun Devils football seasons
Tempe State Bulldogs football